Grand Theft Auto III is a 2001 action-adventure game developed by DMA Design and published by Rockstar Games. It is the third main entry in the Grand Theft Auto series, following 1999's Grand Theft Auto 2, and the fifth instalment overall. Set within the fictional Liberty City (loosely based on New York City), the story follows Claude, a silent protagonist who, after being betrayed and left for dead by his girlfriend during a robbery, embarks on a quest for revenge that leads him to become entangled in a world of crime, drugs, gang warfare, and corruption. The game is played from a third-person perspective and its world is navigated on foot or by vehicle. Its open world design lets players freely roam Liberty City, consisting of three main areas.

Development was shared between DMA Design, based in Edinburgh, and Rockstar, based in New York City. Much of the development involved transforming popular elements from the Grand Theft Auto series into a fully 3D world for the first time. The game was delayed following the September 11 attacks to allow the team to change references and gameplay deemed inappropriate. Grand Theft Auto III was released in October 2001 for the PlayStation 2, in May 2002 for Windows, and in October 2003 for the Xbox.

Grand Theft Auto III received critical acclaim, with particular praise directed at its concept and gameplay. However, it also generated controversy, with criticism directed at its depictions of violence and sex. It became the best-selling video game of 2001, and sold over 14.5 million copies by March 2008. Considered by many critics as one of the most significant titles of the sixth generation of video games and a landmark game in the open world concept, it is often listed among the greatest video games. It won several year-end accolades, including Game of the Year awards from several gaming publications. 

Since its release, it has received ports to many different gaming platforms. An enhanced version of the game was released on mobile platforms in 2011 for the game's tenth anniversary, and a further enhanced version for the twentieth anniversary was released in 2021. The game was followed by 2002's Grand Theft Auto: Vice City, while two prequels, Grand Theft Auto Advance and Grand Theft Auto: Liberty City Stories, were released in 2004 and 2005, respectively.

Gameplay 

Grand Theft Auto III is an action-adventure game played from a third-person perspective. Players complete missions—linear scenarios with set objectives—to progress through the story. It is possible to have several missions available at a time, as some missions require players to wait for further instructions or events. Outside of missions, players can freely roam the game's open world, and have the ability to complete optional side missions. Liberty City is composed of three boroughs: Portland, Staunton Island, and Shoreside Vale; the latter two areas become unlocked as the player progresses through the storyline.

Players may run, jump or use vehicles to navigate the game's world. In combat, auto-aim can be used as assistance against enemies. Should players take damage, their health meter can be fully regenerated through the use of health pick-ups. Body armour can be used to absorb gunshots and explosive damage, but is used up in the process. When health is entirely depleted, gameplay stops and players respawn at the nearest hospital, at the expense of losing armour, weapons, and an amount of money.

If players commit crimes while playing, the game's law enforcement agencies may respond as indicated by a "wanted" meter in the head-up display (HUD). On the meter, the displayed stars indicate the current wanted level (for example, at the maximum six-star level, efforts by law enforcement to incapacitate players become very aggressive). Law enforcement officers will search for players who leave the wanted vicinity. The wanted meter enters a cooldown mode and eventually recedes when players are hidden from the officers' line of sight.

The game lets players control the mute criminal Claude. During the story, Claude meets various new characters from gangs. As players complete missions for different gangs and criminal organisations, fellow gang members will often defend players, while rival gang members will recognise players and subsequently shoot on sight. While free roaming the game world, players may engage in activities such as a vigilante minigame, a firefighting activity, a paramedic service and a taxi cab service. Completion of these activities grants players with context-specific rewards; for example, completing the vigilante mission allows players to bribe police after committing a crime.

Players use melee attacks, firearms and explosives to fight enemies. The firearms include weapons such as the Micro Uzi, an M16 rifle and a flamethrower. The game's three-dimensional environment allows a first-person view while aiming with the sniper rifle, rocket launcher and the M16 rifle. In addition, the game's combat was reworked to allow players to commit drive-by shootings by facing sideways in a vehicle. The game gives players a wide variety of weapon options—they can be purchased from local firearms dealers, found on the ground, retrieved from dead enemies, or found around the city.

Plot 
Small-time criminal Claude is betrayed and shot by his girlfriend Catalina (voiced by Cynthia Farrell) during a bank heist outside Liberty City. Claude is arrested, but escapes during his transfer to prison when members of the Colombian Cartel ambush his transport to abduct another prisoner. During his escape, Claude befriends explosives expert and fellow convict 8-Ball (Guru), who shelters Claude and introduces him to the Leone Mafia family for work. Claude assists the Mafia with various operations, including winning a gang war against a local group of Triads, earning him the respect of Don Salvatore Leone (Frank Vincent). After learning that the Cartel are creating and selling a new street drug called SPANK to fund their expansion into Liberty City, Salvatore orders Claude to destroy their floating drug lab. Claude accomplishes this with 8-Ball's help.

Salvatore later instructs Claude to deal with a minor problem, but his trophy wife Maria (Debi Mazar), who took a liking to Claude, reveals it to be a set-up. Maria claims that she lied to Salvatore about having an affair with Claude to make him jealous, and now Salvatore wants to murder him. Claude escapes to Staunton Island with Maria and her friend Asuka Kasen (Lianna Pai). After assassinating Salvatore to cut ties with the Mafia, Claude begins working for the Yakuza, led by Asuka and her brother Kenji (Les J.N. Mau). During this time, he also provides assistance to corrupt police inspector Ray Machowski (Robert Loggia), whom he eventually helps flee the city, and influential businessman Donald Love (Kyle MacLachlan). Donald hires Claude to assassinate Kenji under the guise of a Cartel attack to start a gang war that will allow Donald to obtain construction sites for his businesses. After the job's success, Claude carries out another task for Donald that leads him to encounter Catalina, now the leader of the Cartel, at a construction site. However, Catalina escapes after betraying and shooting her partner, Miguel (Al Espinosa).

Asuka blames the Cartel for Kenji's death and seizes the construction site. The Yakuza capture the wounded Miguel and torture him for information on Cartel operations in the city, allowing Claude to strike against them and hinder the Cartel. Enraged, Catalina murders both Asuka and Miguel and kidnaps Maria, demanding $500,000 for her release. Claude meets with her to pay the ransom, but Catalina deceives him again and traps him. Claude escapes, rescues Maria, and destroys the helicopter Catalina attempts to flee in, killing her. As Claude and Maria leave the scene, the latter begins to complain about the kidnapping, but is silenced by a gunshot.

Development 

The core development team of Grand Theft Auto III consisted of about 23 people at DMA Design in Edinburgh, who worked closely with publisher Rockstar Games in New York City. The original prototype for the game was created on the Dreamcast around the end of development on the previous game Grand Theft Auto 2 (1999), which led to it being greenlit. By early 2001, the team had designed the city, cars and some weapons. An online multiplayer mode was initially planned for the game, but was ultimately dropped due to time and resource limitations. Producer Leslie Benzies described Grand Theft Auto III as a "crime simulation game". Rockstar originally offered it to Microsoft Game Studios as an Xbox exclusive, but Microsoft declined due to the game's adult nature and its poorly-performing predecessors. The game was released for the PlayStation 2 on 23 October 2001 in North America. When porting the game to Windows, the team delayed it from the PlayStation 2 release in order to ensure quality, citing issues with the simultaneous platform release of previous games in the series. Capcom published the game in Japan in September 2003.

Open-world design 
Grand Theft Auto III is considered to be the first 3D game in the series, using Criterion Games' RenderWare game engine. Executive producer Sam Houser had always wanted the series to move to 3D; the development team of Grand Theft Auto 2 had performed some similar tests, and DMA Design had experimented with 3D worlds with games like Body Harvest and Space Station Silicon Valley (both 1998). With the release of the PlayStation 2, the team felt that a large 3D world was possible. Art director Aaron Garbut felt that other video games at the time "were a thing you played", wanting Grand Theft Auto III to be "a place you lived in".

When designing the game, the development team expanded upon concepts introduced in the previous Grand Theft Auto games. Benzies stated that the intention was to recreate the "freedom and diversity" of the previous games in a "living, breathing 3D world", using the power of the PlayStation 2 to do so. The console's ability to use DVDs, an improvement over the PlayStation's limit to CDs, allowed the team to store more data, such as animations, music and environments. Despite this, the team found it difficult to fit the game into the PlayStation 2's 32 megabytes of RAM, due to the scale. The game's size also created difficulties for the testers, due to the variety of options. Benzies felt that creating a living city was the "underlying principle" of the game's concept during development. Sam Houser felt that the game's 3D element allowed the "chemistry of the team [to come] together perfectly for the first time".

A major difficulty the team encountered was converting all game elements into a fully 3D world, including the sound and radio stations, as well as designing and voicing the non-player characters, due to the amount that existed within the open world. Producer Dan Houser said there were about 8,000 lines of recorded dialogue in the game, while audio programmer Raymond Usher estimated about 18,000. The basic technical elements of the game began to work together in mid-2000, with a carjacking mechanic prototype and stable streaming model. Streaming was initially intended to be reserved for music and map geometry, but other elements were eventually included when it became apparent to the team as more data was entered.

When designing the game world, the team initially created a "hybrid city", which Dan Houser described as "a post industrial Midwest slash east coast generic" city. Upon developing within this game world, the team realised that basing the design on a real location meant "you have a lot of things you can say about it". As a result, they redesigned Liberty City, which had been previously featured in the first Grand Theft Auto (1997), basing it loosely on New York City. DMA Design worked with a team at Rockstar in New York for cultural references; the Rockstar team would regularly work long hours for full weeks, ensuring that the references, such as in-game car manufacturers, were appropriate to the city.

The city is broken into three islands: an industrial section representing Brooklyn and Queens, a commercial centre resembling Manhattan, and suburbs similar to New Jersey. The islands unlock as the story progresses; the team wanted players to "start out feeling poor and work to being richer". Dan Houser described Liberty City as a "hybrid of a generic American city", including Chicago, Pittsburgh, Detroit, New York, and Philadelphia; he felt that the parallel realism of the world allowed the team to make more social commentary than previously. Sam Houser cited films and shows like Heat (1995) and The Sopranos (1999–2007) as inspiration for the setting, and wanted to emulate them in the game. He also cited the influence of The Legend of Zelda, Super Mario 64 and the 1990 film Goodfellas, describing Grand Theft Auto III as "a cross between a gangster movie and an RPG".

Story and characters 
The team developed the story and design simultaneously. Dan Houser said, "we use the story to expose the mechanics, and we use the mechanics to tell the story"; however, he found it difficult to create the narrative, as the game is so strongly focused on player freedom. He wanted the story to be more nuanced and interesting than the generic "rise and fall and rise again of a superhero bad guy". The game's script was also focused on mission objectives, attempting to implement high amounts of interactivity. Dan Houser felt that each mission is "its own short story", and part of an "overarching story". Dan Houser and co-writer James Worrall drew influence from mob films and the mafiosi featured in films by Martin Scorsese; the team also "paid a lot of attention" to shows like Miami Vice and The Sopranos. When writing the story, Dan Houser and Worrall regularly met with the designers, and filled a room with post-it notes to reconstruct the story components to shape the game.

Many of the game characters were animated using motion capture, filmed at a rented studio at the Brooklyn Navy Yard, though this was limited by technical constraints. The character movement was also treated as being cinematic, though limited polygons heavily inhibited this. Animating non-player characters entering and driving cars proved to be difficult for the team, due to the variety of vehicle designs. "It involved chaining together dozens of different animations and altering key frames in code", recalled software engineer Alan Campbell. The team used varying camera angles when animating the game's cutscenes in order to evoke different emotions. For the voice acting, the team wanted "natural, subtle performances", which proved difficult as many of the actors "had in their head the idea that because video games are animated, their performances needed to be animated", explained motion capture director Navid Khonsari.

The playable protagonist is unnamed in the game, and his name is not officially revealed as Claude until his appearance in Grand Theft Auto: San Andreas (2004). He is a silent protagonist, never speaking throughout his appearances; the team decided upon this primarily because it "did not seem like a major issue", due to the other challenges faced during development, and also partly to allow players to identify with the character, as he would be who the players want him to be. The developers did not have "any one single inspiration" for Claude; they liked the idea of a "strong, silent killer, who would be juxtaposed with all of these neurotic and verbose mobsters".

Sound and radio design 
Grand Theft Auto III features about three and a half hours of in-game radio material. For the music, the team sought a broad diversity to recreate the real sensation of skipping through radio stations, reflecting the gangster movie culture invoked by the game. The team used the talk radio stations to add character to the city and provide a "unique take on American life"; Sam Houser described it as "a very iconoclastic look at America". The team used real DJs to portray those on the radio. In doing so, they wrote unusual dialogue for the DJs, seeking the effect of "high production values and absurd content". Music director Craig Conner assembled the assets of the radio station—music, advertisements, DJ dialogue, and station imaging.

Chatterbox FM, one of the game's radio stations, is entirely talk radio hosted by Lazlow Jones, who met Rockstar's managing director Terry Donovan in 2001 as they were both preparing to travel to Los Angeles for E3. Donovan invited Jones to Rockstar's offices in Manhattan, where he met the development team, including Dan and Sam Houser and producer Jamie King, and they invited him to work on the game. The writing sessions took place at Dan Houser's apartment, and the entire process, including editing and recording, took around four to five months. With the station's guests and callers, the writers wanted to satirise American lifestyles, focusing on fictional stories as opposed to quickly outdated stories based on recent news. Jones found the conversations to be natural, having worked in radio for several years. The roles of the guests and callers were performed by Jones's friends and neighbours, including his father, and were recorded in New York.

Cuts and changes 

Prior to Grand Theft Auto IIIs initial release, several modifications were made to the game. While changes are frequent during game development, these changes were noted to be around the time of the attacks of September 11, 2001, which led to speculation that the changes were motivated by the attacks. On 19 September 2001, Rockstar delayed the game's release by three weeks, citing the attacks as an influencing factor in the delay. "Everyone had someone who had an uncle or brother [who was impacted by the attack]", said Paul Eibeler, then president of distributor Take-Two Interactive.

One of the changes made shortly after the 9/11 attacks was the colour scheme of the police cars, which were originally blue with white stripes and resembled that of the New York City Police Department. It was changed to black-and-white designs common among several police departments in the United States, such as Los Angeles and San Francisco. Other changes included altering the flight path of a plane to avoid appearing to fly into or behind a skyscraper and removing a mission referencing terrorists, as well as some changes to pedestrian dialogue and talk radio. Another cut to the game was the character of Darkel, a revolutionary urchin who vowed to bring down the city's economy. When references to Darkel were found in the game's code, speculation arose that he was related to 9/11, but Dan Houser explained that the character had been cut "months before [release]". There are also reports and previews stating that the game featured schoolchildren as pedestrians prior to release, although Rockstar has dismissed such rumours as "nonsense".

Rockstar stated that the game was "about 1% different" after 9/11, and that the biggest change was the cover art. They felt that the game's original cover, which was still used for its release in Europe, was "too raw" after 9/11, and it was changed to what became the "signature style" of the series. Sam Houser stated that the cover was designed in an evening and was instantly preferred over the original cover. The cover was inspired by the movie posters for 1960s films, such as The Thomas Crown Affair (1968).

Critical reception

Initial release 

Grand Theft Auto III was released to critical acclaim. Metacritic calculated an average score of 97 out of 100, indicating "universal acclaim", based on 56 reviews. It is tied with Tony Hawk's Pro Skater 3 as the highest-rated PlayStation 2 game on the site and tied with a number of others as the sixth-highest-rated game overall. Reviewers liked the game's sound, gameplay, and open world design, though some criticism was directed at the controls. Tom Bramwell of Eurogamer called Grand Theft Auto III "a luscious, sprawling epic", and Official PlayStation Magazine named it "the most innovative, outlandish, brilliant video game". GameSpots Jeff Gerstmann described the game as "an incredible experience that shouldn't be missed by anyone"; IGNs Doug Perry named it "one of the best titles of the year, on PlayStation 2, or on any system".

Many reviewers found the 3D graphics a welcome change from the 2D of the previous games. GameSpots Gerstmann particularly praised the character and vehicle models, and the overall texture quality of the city. GameSpys Andrei Alupului found the graphics "really rather impressive", describing the car models as "greatly improved" over those in Midnight Club. Eurogamers Bramwell considered the graphics "generally pleasant to look at", but considered it inferior to games like Gran Turismo 3 and Ico. Justin Leeper of Game Informer described game world as "stunning in scope and detail", and Perry of IGN found it to be "on a scale that's truly epic". Game Revolutions Ben Silverman called the city a "technological marvel ... that captures the essence of gritty city life in amazing detail".

IGNs Perry considered the game's sound "unbelievably and meticulously delivered", particularly praising the soundtrack, voice acting and sound design, stating that it was "really approached as if it were done for a movie". Eurogamers Bramwell echoed similar remarks, describing the city sounds as "perfect" and the soundtrack as "monstrous". The sound was described as "terrific" by GameSpots Gerstmann and Game Revolutions Silverman, and 1UP.com appreciated the subtlety of the in-game radio stations. AllGames Scott Alan Marriott named the music "the true star" of the game.

Reviewers considered the style of the game's missions to be a welcoming departure from those in previous games. 1UP.com described the missions as "wonderfully creative", while GamesMaster appreciated the diversity. IGNs Perry similarly appreciated the variety and scale of the missions, and praised the amount of available side missions. GameSpys Alupului described the game's story as "well-paced" and "coherent", featuring plot elements akin to a mob film. GameSpots Gerstmann found the missions entertaining and challenging, but noted that exploring the game world also offers "a great deal of fun" to players.

Reactions to the game's controls were mixed. Alupului of GameSpy found the game "controls beautifully", both while driving and on-foot. Game Revolutions Silverman identified the control issues as the game's only flaw, although praised the responsiveness of the driving mechanics. Matt Helgeson of Game Informer similarly described the driving as "great", but noted "clunky" combat. GamePros Four-Eyed Dragon found the cars simple to manoeuvre. Edge described the game's combat as "an awkward system that stymies play". 1UP.com noted particular flaws in the targeting system, explaining that it "often focuses on the wrong guy".

Windows version 

When Grand Theft Auto III was released for Windows in May 2002, it received similar acclaim. Metacritic calculated an average score of 93 out of 100, indicating "universal acclaim", based on 20 reviews; the game was Metacritic's highest-rated title for Windows in 2002. Reviewers liked the visual enhancements and control improvements, but criticised the port for its demanding system requirements.

The in-game features and controls in the port were generally well-received. IGNs Tal Blevins praised the higher precision of the mouse controls, finding the aiming mechanic more precise. GameSpots Erik Wolpaw also commended the mouse controls, but disapproved the replay system, particularly due to the lack of options with timing and camera controls. Extended Plays Andrew Bub appreciated the addition of a custom radio station, as well as the availability of custom skins. Daniel Morris of PC Gamer praised the gameplay tweaks provided by the port but criticised the lack of major additional features, such as an overhead map of the in-game city.

The port's visuals received a positive response from reviewers. GameSpots Wolpaw praised the port's reworked textures but criticised the frequent popup and the advanced system requirements. IGNs Blevins similarly criticised the necessity of an advanced system for stable play, but ultimately felt that the port looks "a bit nicer" than the original game. GameSpys Sal Accardo felt that the port "looks much sharper" than the PlayStation 2 version, though noted some "choppy" animations. Extended Plays Bub mentioned that the advanced settings resulted in slowdown and crashes. Game Informers Matt Helgeson noticed little difference between the visuals of the original and the port.

Mobile version 

When Grand Theft Auto III was released to mobile devices in December 2011, it received generally positive reviews. Metacritic calculated an average score of 80 out of 100, based on 26 reviews. Reviewers liked the enhanced visuals, but criticism was directed at the touchscreen controls.

IGNs Peter Eykemans commended the port's smoother textures, especially condensed on a mobile screen, while Destructoids Jim Sterling noted improvements in the character and vehicle models. Mark Walton of GameSpot wrote that the game runs well on high-end devices like the Motorola Xoom and Samsung Galaxy S II, but noticed significant frame rate and texture issues on the Xperia Play. Pocket Gamers Mark Brown identified the game's short draw distance leading to sudden popup, although still found that the models and textures "have been given a tune-up" in the port.

The touchscreen controls received a mixed response. Eurogamers Dan Whitehead appreciated the driving mechanics, but felt that moving on-foot is "a flaky way of navigating" the world, and criticised the "clumsy" shooting mechanics as most of the guns cannot be manually targeted. IGNs Eykemans felt that the controls "make half the experience frustrating", and Destructoids Sterling described them as "by far the biggest barrier toward enjoying" the port. Brown of Pocket Gamer found that the touchscreen "hasn't hindered [the game] too drastically", commending simple movement and "effortless" driving mechanics. Some critics identified better controls upon the use of external gamepads, but felt that they hinder the game's portability.

Commercial performance

Sales 
In the United States, Grand Theft Auto III was the highest-selling game of 2001, selling over two million units by February 2002. The game was also the second-best-selling game of 2002, only behind its sequel, Grand Theft Auto: Vice City. Take-Two stock significantly increased following the game's launch, and the game was included in PlayStation's Greatest Hits selection. In the United States, the game had sold 5.35 million units by June 2004, and 6.55 million units by December 2007. The Windows version accounted for 420,000 sales and $16.9 million in earnings by August 2006 in the United States, where it was the 34th-best-selling computer game between January 2000 and August 2006.

In Japan, Grand Theft Auto III sold about 120,000 copies in its first week, and roughly 300,000 by December 2003. The number rose above 350,000 copies by January 2008. In Europe, over a million copies of the game were reportedly sold by December 2001. The game earned a "Diamond" award in the United Kingdom, indicating over one million sales; it was the first game to receive this award in the region. By March 2008, the game had sold 14.5 million units worldwide.

Accolades 
Grand Theft Auto III received multiple nominations and awards from gaming publications. It was awarded Game of the Year at the 2nd Game Developers Choice Awards, and from GameSpot and GameSpy. It was named the Best PlayStation 2 Game by Game Revolution, GameSpot, GameSpy, and IGN. It also won Best Action Game from Game Revolution, GameSpot, and IGN; Most Innovative from GameSpot; and Excellence in Game Design at the Game Developers Choice Awards. GameSpy also awarded the game Most Offensive, Best Use of Radio, and tied for Best Artificial Intelligence. It won the Global Award at the 7th CESA Game Awards in 2003 and an Award for Excellence at the 8th CESA Game Awards in 2004.

Controversies 
Prior to and since the release of Grand Theft Auto III, the game generated several controversies. GameSpy awarded it the title "Most Offensive Game of the Year", calling it "absolutely reprehensible". They wrote that the game rewards players for "causing mayhem" and "killing innocent people by the dozen", ultimately questioning its appropriateness within the industry. The notoriety of Grand Theft Auto III resulted in American retailer Wal-Mart's decision to check the identification of purchasers who appeared to be under the age of 17 when purchasing mature titles. In an essay, assistant professor Shira Chess identified the lack of conclusion to player violence, due to the ability to respawn upon death or incarceration, and found that it denies the "reality of mortality and simultaneously [forces] it on players". When speaking about the game's depiction of violence, producer Leslie Benzies claimed that is intended to be comedic, and that the game is "not meant to be taken seriously". Producer Dan Houser stated that the team was conscious of the offence that the game would attract, but "never marketed it in a way that exploited that".

The game allows players to participate in sexual activities with prostitutes and murder them to reclaim the payment, which was met with widespread controversy. The game also received some backlash for its depiction of crime and allowing violence against police officers. Psychologist David Walsh of the National Institute on Media and the Family stated that the game "glamorizes antisocial and criminal activity", and that "the purpose of the game is to perpetrate crime". In response, Kotaku writer Owen Good wrote that the game does not reward players for "proficiency at crime, no matter how much it is accused of doing so". Joanna Weiss of The Boston Globe noted the "adrenaline" that players feel when committing crimes in the game, excusing its violence due to its mature classification. In January 2002, the National Organization for Women called for Rockstar and Take-Two to withdraw the game from sale as it "encourages violence and the degradation of women". Matt Richtel of The New York Times wrote that the activities within the game "crossed the line into bad taste".

Grand Theft Auto III was initially released in Australia with an MA15+ classification. After re-reviewing the game, however, the Office of Film and Literature Classification (OFLC) banned it due to its depiction of sexual content and violence against prostitutes. This prompted Take-Two to appeal to the OFLC, who reaffirmed the banned status on 11 December 2001, after reanalysing the game and seeking the professional opinion of a forensic psychologist. As a result, Take-Two recalled the game in Australia, and Rockstar made appropriate changes to the game; a modified version was re-released with an MA15+ classification in January 2002, removing all instances of sexual acts with prostitutes. The game was re-rated with an R18+ classification in September 2019, citing "sexual activities related to incentives and rewards".

On 25 June 2003, teenage stepbrothers William and Josh Buckner shot at motorists, killing Aaron Hamel and wounding Kimberly Bede. In statements to investigators, the perpetrators claimed their actions were inspired by Grand Theft Auto III. In response, on 20 October 2003, the families of Hamel and Bede filed a US$246 million lawsuit against Rockstar, Take-Two, Sony Computer Entertainment and Wal-Mart. Rockstar and Take-Two filed for dismissal of the lawsuit, stating in United States district court on 29 October 2003 that the "ideas and concepts", and the "purported psychological effects" of the perpetrators, are protected by the First Amendment's free-speech clause. Jack Thompson, the lawyer representing the victims, denied Rockstar's claims and attempted to move the lawsuit into a state court for consideration under Tennessee's consumer protection act.

Legacy 

Grand Theft Auto III has been frequently included among the greatest video games of all time. In 2007, GamePro called Grand Theft Auto III the most important video game of all time, explaining that the "game's open-ended gameplay elements have revolutionized the way all video games are made". Similarly, IGN ranked the game among the "Top 10 Most Influential Games", and GameSpot listed it among the greatest games of all time. In 2009, Game Informer wrote that Grand Theft Auto III "changed the gaming landscape forever with its immersive open world sandbox", and in 2016, GamesRadar+ named it the "most important game" of the 2000s. Time named it one of the greatest video games of all time in November 2012 and August 2016. The game was selected as part of the Game On touring exhibition, demonstrating some of the game's development plans and artwork. In 2016, The Strong National Museum of Play inducted Grand Theft Auto III to its World Video Game Hall of Fame.

Grand Theft Auto III is considered to have a leading role in the popularisation of sandbox games, inspiring those such as Crackdown, Mafia, Saints Row, True Crime, and Watch Dogs. The term "Grand Theft Auto clone" is frequently used to describe subsequent video games released with similar open-ended gameplay as Grand Theft Auto III. While previous video games used open world design, including earlier Grand Theft Auto games, Grand Theft Auto III took this gameplay foundation and expanded it into a 3D world, offering an unprecedented variety of minigames and side-missions. Journalist and consultant Tom Bramwell felt that the game did not invent a lot of its gameplay features, but "brought them all together". Due to its greater success over its predecessors, it is credited with popularising the open-world genre; Dan Houser felt that the game made it "one of the most vibrant genres today", and Garbut felt that it led to the complexities of Rockstar's future open world games, including the later Grand Theft Auto titles and Red Dead Redemption 2 (2018). IGNs Jack Harwood wrote that the game's talk radio station inspired similar inclusions in other open world games, such as Mafia III (2016) and Watch Dogs: Legion (2020).

The game also led the trend of mature video games; Dan Houser felt that it allowed other developers to create violent shooters. Hal Halpin, president of the Entertainment Consumers Association, described Grand Theft Auto III as the "lightning rod for the violence-in-games debate". Metros Roger Hargreaves wrote that it "emboldened a whole new wave of games that were ... fixated with violence [and] gang culture". Greg Ford of Electronic Gaming Monthly felt that the game allowed the medium to handle mature subject matter in a more serious manner than previously perceived, and noted the improvement of video game classification as a result of its controversy. King said that video games at the time were often associated with children or nerds, and that the development team "wanted the rest of the entertainment industry to pay attention" and understand that the medium could also contain mature, adult content.

Following the game's success, Rockstar developed further titles in the series. Vice City and San Andreas are set in their titular locations in 1986 and 1992, respectively. Grand Theft Auto Advance (2004) is set in Liberty City roughly a year before the events of Grand Theft Auto III. Grand Theft Auto: Liberty City Stories (2005) takes place three years before the events of Grand Theft Auto III in the same rendition of Liberty City. A completely redesigned version of the city was later used in Grand Theft Auto IV (2008), The Lost and Damned (2009), The Ballad of Gay Tony (2009), and Chinatown Wars (2009).

Ports 
Grand Theft Auto III was released on 21 May 2002 for Windows, supporting higher screen resolutions and draw distance, and featuring more detailed textures. A GameCube release was planned, but later cancelled. In December 2003, the game was released on the Xbox, with its successor, Vice City, as part of the Grand Theft Auto: Double Pack compilation. The Xbox port features custom soundtrack support as well as improved audio, polygon models, and reflections over the previous ports. Double Pack was later bundled with San Andreas as part of Grand Theft Auto: The Trilogy, released in October 2005. The Trilogy was also released for OS X on 12 November 2010. On 15 December 2011, for the game's tenth anniversary, War Drum Studios ported the game to iOS and Android; this port is almost identical to the Windows version, with the addition of enhanced models and textures and touchscreen controls. This port was also released on Fire OS on 15 May 2014. A PlayStation 3 version was released on 25 September 2012 via the PlayStation Network. The original PlayStation 2 version was released for the PlayStation 4 as a PS2 Classics title, on 5 December 2015. In 2012, a modding community under the name RAGE Classic Team ported the map over to Grand Theft Auto IV, named Grand Theft Auto III: RAGE Classic.

An enhanced version of The Trilogy subtitled The Definitive Edition, including Grand Theft Auto III, was released for Windows, Nintendo Switch, PlayStation 4, PlayStation 5, Xbox One, and Xbox Series X/S on 11 November 2021, to celebrate the game's twentieth anniversary; versions for Android and iOS devices are also in development. Existing versions of the game were removed from digital retailers in preparation for The Definitive Edition.

A core team of six fans reverse-engineered the game and released it as an executable in April 2020, having worked on it since 2016; titled re3, the project allows the game to be unofficially ported to platforms such as Nintendo Switch, PlayStation Vita, and Wii U. Take-Two issued a DMCA takedown for the project in February 2021, though it was restored in June after the team filed a counter-notice. In September 2021, Take-Two filed a lawsuit in California against the programmers, asserting that the projects constitute copyright infringement.

Notes

References

Literature

External links 

 
 
 

 
2001 video games
Action-adventure games
Android (operating system) games
Cancelled GameCube games
Censored video games
Cultural depictions of the Mafia
D.I.C.E. Award for Action Game of the Year winners
D.I.C.E. Award for Adventure Game of the Year winners
Game Developers Choice Award for Game of the Year winners
Golden Joystick Award for Game of the Year winners
Golden Joystick Award winners
Grove Street Games games
Impact of the September 11 attacks on the video game industry
Interactive Achievement Award winners
IOS games
MacOS games
Nintendo Switch games
Obscenity controversies in video games
Open-world video games
Organized crime video games
PlayStation 2 games
PlayStation 4 games
PlayStation 5 games
PlayStation Network games
RenderWare games
Rockstar Games games
Rockstar Vienna games
Single-player video games
Take-Two Interactive games
Triad (organized crime)
Video games about revenge
Video games about the illegal drug trade
Video games developed in the United Kingdom
Video games produced by Dan Houser
Video games produced by Leslie Benzies
Video games set in 2001
Video games set in the United States
Video games set on fictional islands
Video games with custom soundtrack support
Video games written by Dan Houser
Windows games
Works about Colombian drug cartels
Works about the Yakuza
World Video Game Hall of Fame
Xbox games
Xbox One games
Xbox Series X and Series S games